The 1975 CONCACAF Champions' Cup was the 11th edition of the annual international club football competition held in the CONCACAF region (North America, Central America and the Caribbean), the CONCACAF Champions' Cup. It determined that year's club champion of association football in the CONCACAF region and was played from 5 July 1975 till 9 May 1976.

The teams were split in 3 zones (North American, Central American and the Caribbean), each one qualifying the winner to the final tournament, where the winners of the North and Central zones played a semi-final to decide who was going to play against the Caribbean champion in the final. All the matches in the tournament were played under the home/away match system.

Mexican club Atlético Español beat Surinamese side Transvaal in the finals 3–0 and 2–1, becoming CONCACAF champion for their first time.

North American Zone

First round

 Monterrey advanced to Second Round.

Second round

 Atlético Español advanced to CONCACAF Final Series.

Central American Zone

First round

 Herediano, Saprissa, Municipal and Aurora advanced to the Second Round.

Second round

 Saprissa and Municipal advanced to the Third Round.

Third round

 Saprissa advanced to CONCACAF Final Series.

Caribbean Zone

Round 1

Universidad apparently disqualified due to the Dominican Republic's failure to pay CONCACAF dues.
Robinhood win on lots
2nd leg reportedly abandoned at 4-0 in 70'; Violette disqualified for using ineligible players.

Round 2

Monte Carlo disqualified due to the Dominican Republic's failure to pay CONCACAF dues
Transvaal and Robinhood advanced to Round 3.

Round 3 

Transvaal advance to the CONCACAF Champions' Cup Final.

Semi-final 

Atlético Español advance to the CONCACAF Final.
Transvaal bye to the CONCACAF Final.

Final

First leg

Second leg 

Atlético Español won 4–0 on points (5–1 on aggregate)

Champion

References

1
CONCACAF Champions' Cup